Nemapogon multistriatella is a moth of the family Tineidae. It is found in North America, where it has been recorded from Illinois, Maine, Maryland, Oklahoma, Ontario, South Carolina and West Virginia.

References

Moths described in 1905
Nemapogoninae